The LFG V 60 was a small, single engine, tandem seat floatplane training aircraft, designed and built in Germany in the mid-1920s. About five were constructed.

Design and development

The LFG V 60 was a biplane floatplane, with wings of constant chord and with rounded wing tips; they were of approximately equal span and mounted with little stagger.  It was a two bay biplane with pairs of parallel interplane struts, though the inner bay was quite narrow.  There were ailerons on both upper and lower planes, externally connected.

Its engine was a  six cylinder inline, water cooled BMW IV, mounted with its cylinder heads exposed, which drove a two blade propeller.  The fuselage was flat sided and accommodated the two crew in a continuous open, tandem cockpit.  The tailplane was mounted on top of the fuselage and the vertical tail was tall and rounded, the rudder extending below the keel.  The V 60 had twin float landing gear attached to the wing and lower fuselage on a number of V-struts and laterally cross braced.

Operational history
One V 60 was entered into the German Seaplane Competition held in July 1926 on the Baltic coast. During one flight the pilot, Haase, put down on the sea to make some adjustment but was swept away.  The aircraft and its passenger were rescued.

Two other V 60s were registered to DVS GmbH early in 1928.

Operators
 DVS GmbH

Specifications

References

Biplanes
Floatplanes
1920s German civil aircraft
LFG V 61